Li Ye may refer to:

 Li Ye (Juyou) (李業), style name Juyou (巨游), Eastern Han Dynasty official and scholar
 Li Ye (Prince of Xue) (died 734), born Li Longye, son of Emperor Ruizong of Tang
 Li Ye (poet) (died 784), poet
 Emperor Zhaozong of Tang (867–904), name Li Ye (李曄), the 19th emperor of the Tang Dynasty
 Li Ye (mathematician) (李冶; 1192–1279), mathematician and scholar, birth name Li Zhi (李治)
 Li Ye (speed skater) (李野; born 1983), Chinese short track speed skater

See also 
 Ye Li (born 1981), Chinese women's basketball player